Shit-Hot is an album by L'amourder, a pseudonym for Sielun Veljet. It contains re-recorded versions of their songs translated into English.

Track listing 
 Forever hungry (= Aina nälkä)
 Luminous force (= Säkenöivä voima).
 Love on the edge (= Rakkaudesta)
 I got mine (= Tää on tää)
 Misery (= Ikävä)
 Shit-hot (= Aja!).
 Bitches brew (= Kuka teki huorin)
 Emil Zatopek
 Do the twitch (= Nyt nykii).
 Song, A (= Laulu).
 City of smiling snakes (= Lainsuojaton)
 Nazional day (= Kansallispäivä)

Track listing (v.2) 
 City Of Smiling Snakes—03:28
 Do The Twitch—02:28
 Emil Zatopek—02:42
 I Got Mine—02:46
 Nazional Day—04:03
 Bitches Brew—04:21
 Love On The Edge—04:25
 Luminous Force—02:37
 Forever Hungry—03:07
 Shit-Hot—01:55
 Misery—02:57
 A Song—03:51

Personnel
 Ismo Alanko – vocals, guitar
 Jukka Orma—guitar, vocals
 Jouko Hohko – bass, vocals
 Alf Forsman – drums, percussion

References

1987 albums
Sielun Veljet albums